Alec Smith (1949–2006) was a Rhodesian farmer and army chaplain, the son of Prime Minister Ian Smith.

Alec Smith may also refer to:
Alec Smith (footballer, born 1873) (1873–1908), Scottish footballer
Alec Smith (footballer, born 1875) (1875–1954), Scottish footballer
Alec Smith (trade unionist) (1930–2021), British trade unionist, former general secretary of the National Union of Tailors and Garment Workers

See also
Alic Halford Smith (1883–1958), British philosopher and Vice-Chancellor of the University of Oxford
Alex Smith (disambiguation)
Alexander Smith (disambiguation)
Rupert Alec-Smith (1913–1983), historian of East Yorkshire, England